Vasile Vasilievici Stroescu (Vasily Vasilyevich Stroesko; November 11, 1845 – April 13, 1926), also known as Vasile de Stroesco, Basile Stroesco, or Vasile Stroiescu, was a Bessarabian and Romanian politician, landowner, and philanthropist. One of the proponents and sponsors of Romanian nationalism in Russia's Bessarabia Governorate, as well as among the Romanian communities of Austria-Hungary, he was also a champion of self-help and of cooperative farming. He inherited or purchased large estates, progressively dividing them among local peasants, while setting up local schools and churches for their use. An erudite and traveler, he abandoned his career in law to focus on his agricultural projects and cultural activism. For the latter work, he became an honorary member of the Romanian Academy.

Having backed the nationalist papers Basarabia and Cuvânt Moldovenesc, Stroescu was drawn into the more elitist cell of the nationalist movement, centered on the parts of the zemstva and gentry assembly. He was thus honorary president of the National Moldavian Party shortly after the February Revolution but, with Vladimir Herța, drifted away from the core of the movement to set up his own aristocratic branch. He became an absentee member of Sfatul Țării during the existence of a Moldavian Democratic Republic and its union with Romania. In 1919–1920, he served in the Assembly of Deputies, and was its de facto President for one day, on November 20, 1919. Rallying with the Bessarabian Peasants' Party, Stroescu became critical of the unification process, decrying government abuses in Bessarabia, and also objected to the 1920s land reform. He died shortly after in Bucharest, having also served in the Senate, and was granted a state funeral.

Biography

Beginnings
The Stroescus were a family of ethnic Romanian aristocrats and shepherds from Moldavia: the family patriarch Ioan Stroescu had the Moldavian boyar title of jitnicer in the late 17th century. His grandson, Gavriil, was a șătrar; Ienache, Gavriil's son, reverted to pastoralism, and owned ranches in Iași County. His own two sons Vasile (1795–1875) and Ioan moved between Moldavia and Bessarabia, which, following the 1812 Treaty of Bucharest, had been absorbed into the Russian Empire. Vasile owned ten estates on either side of the border, split between Iași and Hotin counties. The Stroescus were all inducted into Russian nobility in 1828 and granted arms in 1867. From his marriage to Profira Manoil Guțu (1808–1856), Vasile Sr had three sons—Mihail (1836–1889), Gheorghe (1840–1922), Vasile Jr. The couple also had four daughters, married off to aristocrats of Russian, Greek, or Polish Bessarabian descent: Ana Kazimir, Maria Druganov, Elena Martos, and Ecaterina Șumanski. The latter's husband was Clemente Șumanski, Mayor of Kishinev in the 1870s.

Vasile Jr was born on November 11, 1845, in Trinca, a Hotin County village (now in Edineț District, Moldova). He attended the Bessarabian Lyceum of Kishinev, then the school of Kamenets-Podolskiy and Odessa's Richelieu Lyceum. Later, he studied law at the universities of Moscow, Saint Petersburg, and Berlin. The latter awarded him a doctorate of law. An erudite, Stroiescu reportedly spoke all Slavic languages, German, French, English and Italian, in addition to his native Romanian. Upon graduation, he traveled throughout Europe, including in the Kingdom of Romania, and also visited the Western colonies in Africa. This was a passion shared by his older brother Mihail, who was once shipwrecked in the Pacific, and later wrote memoirs of his adventures.

Vasile was appointed a judge at the Hotin city tribunal in 1867, becoming colleagues with writer Alexandru Hâjdeu. Following his father's death, he withdrew from the legal profession altogether, making Brînzeni his main residence. There, he began his trade as a gentleman farmer, peasant educator, and amateur agronomist, while maintaining a lively interest in historical research. After receiving his inheritance, Stroescu owned 9,000 hectares (22,000 acres), but later came to purchase 16,000 more hectares (some 4,000 acres) of land, with several manors, ranches, and stables, making him one of the richest people in the region.

Many of his properties he auctioned off, using the money to finance his philanthropy, or divided between the peasant obshchiny, with Stroescu as a pioneer of cooperative farming and cooperative forestry. He personally verified his plowmen's techniques and corrected their mistakes. As noted by Brînzeni native Ion Buzdugan, he was "modest and balanced", but also "ruthless with those who squandered his wealth." Fellow activist Pan Halippa noted that Stroescu was a "real democrat" and "true Christian", who "never married and lived modestly." "This man", Halippa claims, "used his great managerial competence to please those living on his estate. He [...] helped everyone own a proper home grange, acting as a statesman ought to. [...] If only those ministers who call themselves democrats and socialists could know how the great Bessarabian Romanian Vasile Stroescu used to live!" By 1918, Stroescu only had some 8,000 hectares left to his name, spread about between Trinca, Bădragii Vechi, Druța and Zăbriceni.

Nationalist sponsor
As noted by historian Iurie Colesnic, Stroescu and Nicolae Ștefan Casso stood among those boyars who reverted Russification or Moldovenism, "neutralizing the influence" of pro-imperial adversaries such as Alexander N. Krupensky. Stroescu built of refurbished several schools in Bessarabia, founded hospitals in his native village and in Brătușeni, and became ktitor of Bessarabian Orthodox churches in Trinca, Pociumbăuți, Șofrîncani, and Zăicani. In 1899, he offered to sponsor state schools, provided that they be allowed to teach classes in Romanian. This proposal was simply disregarded by government. With the liberalization made possible by the Revolution of 1905, Stroescu began participating in conspiratorial meetings of the Romanian elite in Kishinev, exchanging ideas with Halippa, Nicolae Alexandri, Ion Inculeț, Nicolae Bivol, Alexis Nour, Ion Pelivan, and Paul Gore, where they first discussed the prospect of Romania and Bessarabia uniting. As Pelivan notes, he and Emanuil Gavriliță tried to persuade Stroescu to finance a magazine for the Romanian-speaking populace, but the landowner "seemed rather skeptical". However, in 1906 he sponsored Halippa in setting up a democratic-and-nationalist newspaper, Basarabia, eventually shut down by the Russian authorities in March 1907.

By 1910, Stroescu had expatriated himself to Switzerland, and was living in Davos Platz. His charity work continued to have a profound effect among the Romanian communities of Transylvania, in Austria-Hungary, where Stroescu notably founded the boarding house serving the Diocese of Arad, as well as "tens of churches, schools and hospitals". Although a patron of Romanian Orthodoxy, he was critical of the church's claim to have preserved Romanian identity, noting that its nationalist discourse was a recent "invention of the parsons, to emphasize their own merits". He saw Orthodoxy as equal to its rival Romanian Greek-Catholic Church, arguing that "a religious difference cannot divide us", since "Romanians of both religions behave one to the other as true Christians and therefore as brethren". As such, in 1910 Stroescu allied himself with the Greek Catholics to tackle the effects of Magyarization, donating 100,000 Kronen to the cultural fund in Blaj.

Other estimates suggest that his sponsorship of schools, including Orthodox ones, ran at 950,000 Kronen in 1913–500,000 of these were channeled through Partenie Cosma, and 200,000 more through the Archbishopric of Sibiu, while 100,000 went to the creation of a girls' school in Arad. His contribution also included a Stroescu Fund at ASTRA Society and various payments to the Cultural League for the Unity of All Romanians. In Romanian-ruled Western Moldavia, he fitted primary schools from a special fund, which ran at 200,000 lei, and, in 1906–1908, put up 300,000 lei for the building of a Romanian People's Salvation Cathedral.

In May 1910, as recognition of his activities, and in particular for his work with the Blaj foundations, Stroescu was elected an honorary member of the Romanian Academy. This appointment left him indifferent, as he considered his deeds "only natural". He declared himself "at my country's disposal, with all this mind God gave me, from all my heart and with my entire wealth". According to Halippa and Pelivan, his focus fell on Transylvania and elsewhere only because censorship and repression prevented him from openly financing nationalism in his native province. Another account is that he was felt called into action by the anti-Magyarization writings of Ioan Slavici. Moreover, his philanthropic activity was preceded by that of his late brother Mihail, who, as early as 1882, had set up ten model schools in Romania-proper, after having failed to create a Romanian studies department at Novorossiya University. Also noted for founding a school in Stolniceni, Mihail had set up a rural hospital at Bekir, eventually splitting his wealth between ASTRA, the Romanian vocational schools of Brașov, and his tenant farmers.

The family's renewed contributions have led various authors to refer to Vasile as Transylvania or Bessarabia's "Maecenas". Transylvanians such as Justinian Teculescu dedicated him verse of praise; others believed that he was not a real man, but a fictional character created by the Romanian state to hide its direct involvement in Austro-Hungarian affairs. Stroescu also sponsored individual Bessarabians to pursue their education abroad, as he did with physician and fellow Romanian nationalist Elena Alistar, and founded an eponymous Stroescu Help Club for the Romanian Americans of Cleveland. Between June 1910 and August 1911, he paid for Nour to publish a Russian-language paper, Bessarabets, and, after 1913, financed the newspaper Cuvânt Moldovenesc, published by Halippa and Alexandri, also helping peasants with their subscriptions.

By 1912, Stroescu was living in Lausanne, but still appeared incognito to celebrate the golden jubilee of Petru Maior Society in Budapest. However, he was expressing his disenchantment with his Transylvanian colleagues. His letters to his fund's beneficiaries often included "drastic reprimands." In early 1913, he published a piece in the newspaper Românul of Arad, attacking Romanian banks for paying dividends higher than 5%, and their clients for accepting them; the difference, he argued, could go toward sponsoring culture. Responding to this "judicious and unusually categorical" critique, the economist Ion Mateiu suggested that the reduction demanded by Stroescu was needlessly abrupt. Stroescu, who donated 50,000 Kronen to settling disputes between ASTRA and the popular banks, and then to the creation of alternative credit unions, found sympathy with the writing team at Luceafărul, which basked in his critique of "our petty bourgeoisie [and] its plutocratic ideals". Through ASTRA, he also distributed his brochure Statutele și îndrumările pentru băncile poporale ("Statutes and Guiding for the People's Banks"). The Bihar County bankers objected to such initiatives, seeing Stroescu as an unfair competitor to their business.

Revolution and union
By 1914, Stroescu's relations with the Austro-Hungarian authorities were noticeably strained. His sponsoring of a Christmas 1913 folk party in Beiuș almost ended with the prosecution of its organizer, Nicolae Coroiu. The outbreak of World War I caught Stroescu on the Russian side, ending all his work in Transylvania; the government of István Tisza listed him as a "public menace", suspected of wanting to incite a Romanian rebellion in Transylvania. He returned to Odessa in 1914, and managed to persuade the authorities to release his protégée Alistar, who had been arrested for sedition. In late 1916, Romania entered the war, siding with Russia against Austria-Hungary and the other Central Powers. Following the February Revolution, which inaugurated an episode of social rebellion and national emancipation throughout Russia, the Stroescus were targeted by Russian revolutionaries. Gheorghe's former manor in Bălceana was ransacked by deserters from the Romanian Front, who burned down his manuscripts, and so were other country homes owned by the family. The Brânzeni estate was spared: the peasants there, having already set up a network for trafficking Romanian books into Bessarabia, also formed a self-defense unit which protected their shared wealth.

Vasile was at Soroca, where he signed a manifesto for Bessarabian self-determination, officially backed by the zemstvo and the gentry assembly. This came only after protracted negotiations with a Transylvanian refugee, Onisifor Ghibu, who was perplexed that Bessarabians "hardly understood the importance of having a political party [...] that would militate for the national cause." Stroescu held on to an apolitical stance, replying that "he was ready to give as much as he had, but only for cultural enterprises, because politics, he said, was a dirty activity." At Kishinev in early 1917, he met the Transylvanian activist Hortensia Goga, who described him as "healthy and content, [...] seems not to be preoccupied by anything except his own person."

Eventually, the PNM, representing the more right-wing and nationalist politicians in the Governorate, proposed Bessarabian autonomy and the creation of a national legislature, Sfatul Țării. Stroescu, as the "Grand Old Man" of nationalism, was the PNM's honorary leader, with Paul Gore as the executive president and Halippa as secretary. Later, he and Halippa attended the Soldiers' Congress in Odessa, which affirmed its support for "autonomous Bessarabia" and a federated Russian Republic. The uniformed procession paid him homage by parading in front of London Hotel, where he was staying. In June of the same year, as the gentry assembly formed a Society for Assisting Popular Education and the Study of National Customs, Stroescu became honorary chairman; Gore and Vladimir Herța were its "active presidents".

During the October Revolution and Russia's disintegration, Sfatul Țării was established and Stroescu nominally stood in the regional election. At the time, Pelivan argues, Stroescu was "a great nationalist, but less of a democrat", and alienated from his constituents because "(since 1900) he lived mostly abroad." As noted by Halippa, Stroescu and Herța were trying to set up a distinct PNM for the boyars: "their action did not lead to much [...], although we revolutionaries never objected to them being elected to Sfatul Țării [...], since we believed that all intellectual forces needed to be consulted in political matters". Historian Charles Upson Clark claims that he even served for a while as the legislature's president, during Bessarabia's brief existence as a nominally independent Moldavian Democratic Republic. However, Stroescu is known to have been seriously ill from September 1917 to the early months of 1919, leaving for England and France, and only championed the union of Bessarabia with Romania from afar.

According to a report by Iustin Frățiman, some of Stroescu's charity works were destroyed during a wave of vandalism instigated by the Bolshevik soldiers in Bessarabia: "The books donated by Vasiles Stroescu to one library were used to set a fire that lasted for three days on end!" In March, when Sfatul Țării was visited by the Romanian Prime Minister Alexandru Marghiloman and voted in favor of union, Stroescu was in Paris. This was an uncertain period, with him in Allied territory while Romania capitulated to the Central Powers. At the time, Stroescu wrote his will, with Pelivan as his executor. It called for redistributing his land (much of it already taken over by the zemstvo), or, alternatively, donating it to the Romanian state; in exchange, he only demanded that peasants receive education in Romanian. As noted in 1927 by Clark, this document reflected the "comfortable old Russian patriarchal atmosphere", and was already outdated by the pace of "militant equalization"—although the dream of Romanian education was eventually fulfilled by the state itself, with its mandatory literacy programs.

Assembly President and dissenter
On September 1, 1918, returning to Paris, Stroescu joined Vasile Lucaciu and Ioan Cantacuzino in creating a National Romanian Action Committee for promoting the cause of Greater Romania in Allied countries. He later attached himself to Take Ionescu's National Committee for Romanian Unity. Following the November Armistice, Marghiloman was deposed and Romania, Bessarabia included, reentered the war. In December, this step ensured the Transylvanian union, with the new borders awaiting international recognition at the Paris Peace Conference. Throughout the following months, to Marghiloman's worry, Western powers seemed to favor placing Bessarabia, in whole or in part, under a League of Nations mandate. In March 1919 (some two months into the conference), Stroescu also came out in support of other pan-Romanian causes. He became honorary president of the League for the Liberation of Romanians in Timoc and Macedonia; its executive leaders included George Murnu, Sever Bocu and Tache Papahagi.

In the national election of November 1919, Halippa enlisted Stroescu as a candidate for his Bessarabian Peasants' Party (PȚB), which resulted in him representing Orhei County in the Assembly of Deputies. Stroescu shared his ticket with historian Nicolae Iorga, although the latter was not a PȚB man. As recalled by Halippa, he ran simultaneously (and won) in three other electoral precincts—Hotin, Soroca, and Bălți; and, according to other sources, also in Tighina County and Lăpușna. On November 20, as an homage to his work in promoting the Romanian cause, Stroescu was also selected to preside upon Greater Romania's first parliamentary session, effectively as the Assembly's honorary President. Praised by Iorga for its composition and style, the speech forewarned: "With a habit that has become second-nature, we scour the scene to find ways in which we may partake in the fruit of other people's labor. No, Gentlemen, this will no loger do! We must labor ourselves and commit to providing for ourselves. [...] In this life of ours we must maintain clean thoughts and clean hands." This drew attention from Marghiloman's Progressive Conservatives, disgraced for their sympathy for the Central Powers. Marghiloman was drawn to Stroescu's anti-corruption hints, namely that "the new administrations of Bessarabia should keep their hands clean."

Also on November 20, the Assembly Presidency went to Alexandru Vaida-Voevod, replaced on December 1 by Iorga; Stroescu still preserved his role as a dean of the Bessarabian caucus: on December 29, he presented for ratification the law on Romanian–Bessarabian unification, which was unanimously carried. Within months, however, he became a critic of the Romanian administration, speaking at the Assembly rostrum about the deteriorating situation of his native province and the state of siege it was placed under. On February 10, 1920, he took a stand against Ion Inculeț, the PȚB Minister for Bessarabia, accusing him of tolerating "oppression in savage fashion", and concluding, to his colleagues' dismay, that "the situation was better under the old Russian régime." This pitted him against the mainstream of his party, and also against Iorga. Despite shows of support from the Socialist Party benches and some PȚB deputies, Iorga suspended the session, accusing Stroescu of having "insult[ed] all the past and the future of the nation"; he was supported in this by Marghiloman. In his diary, Iorga summarized the incident: "Stroescu insulted from the rostrum this country as one of exploiters and awful clerks. I asked him to step down."

Stroescu was also censured by Inculeț, who dismissed his speech as "café gossip" and a landowner's malcontent, noting that the Bessarabian gentry as a whole reacted with "profound egotism" to the proposed land reform. Nevertheless, Stroescu's position was endorsed by the daily Adevărul, which referred to Inculeț as a "satrap" who simply ignored criticism, and called Iorga's moderating stance "absurd diplomacy". The paper also denounced Inculeț's suggestion that those dissatisfied with his administration, Stroescu included, could opt to move to Soviet Russia. In March, according to the same Iorga, Stroescu voted "discreetly" against land reform, and then spoke out against the majority of supporters.

According to historians Sorina and Ioan Bolovan, "Stroescu kept apart from the demagoguery, careerism and pettiness of political intrigues." In August 1923, partly as a protest against government arbitrariness, he participated in the founding of a League for Human Rights, with such members as Constantin Costa-Foru, Dem I. Dobrescu, Victor Eftimiu, Grigore Iunian, Ioan Pangal, Istrate Micescu, Ilie Moscovici, Constantin Titel Petrescu, Radu D. Rosetti, and Ștefan Voitec. He was elected its first president, with Costa-Foru serving as his secretary. His criticism of government was followed with interest in White émigré circles, where it was believed that a restored Russian monarchy should include Bessarabia. On their behalf, Alexander N. Krupensky suggested that Stroescu, "an honest man in spite of his accepting to be 'elected' by the Roumanian Government as one of the Bessarabian deputies", openly spoke on topics that Iorga and other establishment politicians wanted kept secret. In Soviet Russia, which advanced its own claim to Bessarabia, propagandist Christian Rakovsky also used Stroescu's words against Romanian nationalist claims in his 1925 exposé, Rumynia i Bessarabia.

Death and legacy

With his final donation of land, Stroescu renounced his manor in Brînzeni to set up an agricultural and technical school. His prewar fund for ASTRA's public libraries, comprising 25,000 Kronen in 1914, was supplemented by the Transylvania's Directing Council and put to use in 1920. Before his death in Bucharest on April 14, 1926, Stroescu served in Senate, representing a Transylvanian constituency. His funeral service was held on April 17 at the Orthodox White Church on Calea Victoriei, and witnessed orations by priest Ioan Lupaș, who was also the incumbent Minister of Health, and by Patriarch Miron Cristea; the following day, a memorial service was held at Sibiu Cathedral.

Reportedly, Stroescu had wanted to be cremated and have his ashes scattered all over Romania. He was instead awarded a state funeral at Bucharest's Sfânta Vineri Cemetery. His tomb there was later decorated with a bust by the Moldavian Mihai Onofrei, and a Bucharest street was renamed after him. The funeral itself was attended by his former colleague and rival Iorga. He noted delegates of all those who had been helped by the deceased—the church, the Bessarabian Peasantists, and the nationalists—but also that the establishment itself was absent. In his obituary, Iorga referred to Stroescu as a "great charitable man and generous benefactor". Other obituaries appeared during the following week. They included front-page editorials in Universul, Gazeta Transilvaniei, Telegraful Român, Cuvântul Ardealului and (penned by Ghibu) Biruința, with additional coverage in ASTRA's Societatea de Mâine.

As argued by journalist M. Gh. Carpen, Stroescu had already been forgotten in Transylvania a full decade before his death; the brief revival of interest in 1920 had given way to his being tarnished by the "mud puddle" of politics. Stroescu's activity was first explored methodically in an essay by Alexandru Ciulcu, published by Viața Basarabiei magazine in 1940. Just months later, Bessarabia fell under a Soviet occupation, during which Ciulcu himself was killed by the NKVD. Stroescu's memory was repressed in the resulting Moldavian SSR and, later, in Communist Romania. Nationalized, the Brînzeni manor was turned into a psychiatric clinic. During the national communism of the 1960s, Halippa and the Bessarabian community in Bucharest tried to commemorate their former leader, but were reportedly prevented to do so by the authorities. However, in 1968, Halippa managed to invoke Stroescu and bring up the issue of his being "forgotten", with a formal address to the Academy. Such work was partly continued in America by a nephew of Stroescu's, the journalist Gheorghe Ștefan Donev (1909–1993).

The repressive trend was reversed following the Romanian Revolution of 1989: in 2013, a Palace of the Parliament hall was renamed in his honor, but, as historian Sever Dumitrașcu noted, no Transylvanian school once funded by his money ever accepted to acknowledge him in the same fashion. In independent Moldova, the lyceum in Brînzeni took his name. A Moldovan Vasile Stroescu Foundation was created, a memorial plaque was put up in 1996 at Trinca, and efforts have been made to establish a memorial house in Brînzeni.

Notes

References
The Roumanian Occupation in Bessarabia. Documents. Paris: Imprimerie Lahure, [1920].  
Rodica Andruș, "Sufletul românesc nu cunoaște frontiere. Boierul Vasile Stroiescu", in Sargetia, Vol. XXX, 2002, pp. 587–592.
Andrei Bârseanu, Romul Simu, "Raportul general al comitetului central al »Asociațiunii pentru literatură și cultura poporului român« asupra lucrărilor sale și a situației acesteia în annul 1919", in Transilvania, Nr. 5–9/1920, pp. 547–579.
Alberto Basciani, La difficile unione. La Bessarabia e la Grande Romania, 1918–1940. Rome: Aracne Editore, 2007.  
Gheorghe G. Bezviconi, Boierimea Moldovei dintre Prut și Nistru, Vol. II. Bucharest: National Institute of History, 1943.
Sorina Paula Bolovan, Ioan Bolovan, "Vasile Stroescu dans la conscience publique de Transylvanie", in Transylvanian Review, Vol. XI, Issue 2, 2002, pp. 22–29.
Ștefan Ciobanu, La Bessarabie. Sa population—son passé—sa culture (Académie Roumaine. Études et recherches XIII). Bucharest: Monitorul Oficial, 1941.
Charles Upson Clark, Bessarabia. Russia and Roumania on the Black Sea. New York City: Dodd, Mead and Company, 1927.  
Iurie Colesnic, Chișinăul din inima noastră. Chișinău: B. P. Hașdeu Library, 2014.  
Ion Constantin, Gherman Pântea între mit și realitate. Bucharest: Editura Biblioteca Bucureștilor, 2010.  
Ion Constantin, Ion Negrei, Pantelimon Halippa: tribun al Basarabiei. Bucharest: Editura Biblioteca Bucureștilor, 2009.  
Ion Constantin, Ion Negrei, Gheorghe Negru, Ioan Pelivan: istoric al mișcării naționale din Basarabia. Bucharest: Editura Biblioteca Bucureștilor, 2012.  
Dragoș Galbur, "«Soarta poporului român din Basarabia se află în mâinile noastre. Să voim și vom face totul»", in Alexe Rău (ed.), Basarabenii în lume. (Colecție de materiale și documente prezentate la polipticul cultural-istoric și științific omonim), Vol. VI, pp. 160–166. Chișinău: National Library of Moldova, 2012. 
Mihai Iliev, "Vasile Stroescu și românii din Bihor", in Tyragetia, Vol. VI, Issue 2: "Istorie. Muzeologie", pp. 253–256.
Nicolae Iorga, Memorii, Vol. II: (Însemnări zilnice maiu 1917–mart 1920). Războiul național. Lupta pentru o nouă viață politică. Bucharest: Editura Națională Ciornei, 1930.  
Alexandru Marghiloman, Note politice, 4. 1918–1919. Bucharest: Editura Institutului de Arte Grafice Eminescu, 1927.
Paweł Henryk Rutkowski, "Zjednoczenie Besarabii z Królestwem Rumunii w 1918 roku", in Marcin Kosienkowski (ed.), Spotkania polsko‑mołdawskie. Księga poświęcona pamięci Profesora Janusza Solaka, pp. 139–149. Lubin: Episteme, 2013. 
Constantin I. Stan, "Activitatea Episcopului Justinian Teculescu pentru realizarea și consolidarea Marii Uniri", in Angvstia, Vol. 13, 2009, pp. 159–170.
Svetlana Suveică, Basarabia în primul deceniu interbelic (1918–1928): modernizare prin reforme. Monografii ANTIM VII. Chișinău: Editura Pontos, 2010.  

1845 births
1926 deaths
Anti-Russification activists
National Moldavian Party politicians
Bessarabian Peasants' Party politicians
Moldovan MPs 1917–1918
Presidents of the Chamber of Deputies (Romania)
Members of the Senate of Romania
Nobility from the Russian Empire
Romanian nobility
Moldovan judges
Jurists from the Russian Empire
Moldovan philanthropists
Philanthropists from the Russian Empire
Romanian philanthropists
Romanian cooperative organizers
Agriculturalists from the Russian Empire
Romanian agriculturalists
Moldovan magazine founders
Magazine founders from the Russian Empire
Moldovan newspaper founders
Newspaper founders from the Russian Empire
Literacy advocates
School founders
Moldovan human rights activists
Romanian human rights activists
Honorary members of the Romanian Academy
People from Edineț District
Eastern Orthodox Christians from Moldova
Members of the Romanian Orthodox Church
Moscow State University alumni
Saint Petersburg State University alumni
Humboldt University of Berlin alumni
Expatriates from the Russian Empire in Switzerland
Russian people of World War I
Moldovan expatriates in the United Kingdom
Moldovan expatriates in France

Culture of Transylvania
History of Transylvania (1867–1918)
Burials at Sfânta Vineri Cemetery